The following lists of video game companies are available:
 List of video game developers
 List of video game publishers
 List of indie game developers

Video game companies
Companies